Clifton is a town in Pierce County, Wisconsin, United States. The population was 1,657 at the 2000 census.

Geography
According to the United States Census Bureau, the town has a total area of 35.6 square miles (92.1 km2), of which, 34.3 square miles (89.0 km2) of it is land and 1.2 square miles (3.1 km2) of it (3.40%) is water.

Demographics
As of the census of 2000, there were 1,657 people, 543 households, and 457 families residing in the town. There were 592 housing units at an average density of 17.2 per square mile (6.7/km2). The racial makeup of the town was 99.09% White, 0.18% African American, 0.24% Native American, 0.30% Asian, 0.12% from other races, and 0.06% from two or more races. Hispanic or Latino of any race were 0.42% of the population.

There were 543 households, out of which 45.3% had children under the age of 18 living with them, 78.3% were married couples living together, 3.1% had a female householder with no husband present, and 15.8% were non-families. 11.8% of all households were made up of individuals, and 3.1% had someone living alone who was 65 years of age or older. The average household size was 3.05 and the average family size was 3.33.

In the town, the population was spread out, with 30.9% under the age of 18, 6.8% from 18 to 24, 31.3% from 25 to 44, 25.3% from 45 to 64, and 5.7% who were 65 years of age or older. The median age was 36 years. For every 100 females, there were 111.4 males. For every 100 females age 18 and over, there were 111.3 males.

The median income for a household in the town was $71,810, and the median income for a family was $75,836. Males had a median income of $48,355 versus $32,257 for females. The per capita income for the town was $25,352. About 0.4% of families and 1.2% of the population were below the poverty line, including 0.8% of those under age 18 and none of those age 65 or over.

References

Towns in Pierce County, Wisconsin
Towns in Wisconsin